Motonobu (written: 元信, 基信 or 仁重) is a masculine Japanese given name. Notable people with the name include:

 (1532–1585), Japanese samurai
 (1476–1559), Japanese painter
 (died 1581), Japanese samurai
 (1555–1620), Japanese samurai
 (born 1972), Japanese footballer
 (born 1970), Japanese baseball player

Japanese masculine given names